William B. Rossow is an American atmospheric scientist, who was for many years the head of the International Satellite Cloud Climatology Project. He is currently a Distinguished Professor at City University of New York, and also a published author. He is a Fellow of the American Geophysical Union and American Mathematical Society.

References

21st-century American engineers
City University of New York faculty
Cornell University alumni
21st-century American physicists
Hanover College alumni
1947 births
Living people
Atmospheric physicists